Russell Vincent "Russ" Anderson (born February 12, 1955) is an American former professional ice hockey defenseman who played 519 games in the National Hockey League between 1976 and 1985. Anderson was a member of the United States National team at the 1977 Ice Hockey World Championships.

Early life
He played high school hockey for Washburn High School in Minneapolis where he was also a standout football player. After getting a scholarship to play college football for the University of Minnesota Anderson found himself injured with a torn Achilles tendon. Thinking his athletic career was over, Herb Brooks came to the training room and told Anderson to try out for the Gopher hockey team. Russ Anderson made the team and ended up winning an NCAA Championship in 1976.

Playing career
Russ Anderson, nicknamed "Andy" played hockey in the NHL from 1976 until 1985. He played for the Pittsburgh Penguins, Hartford Whalers, and Los Angeles Kings. He was also a member of the United States National team at the 1977 Ice Hockey World Championships.

Personal life
While playing with the Penguins, Anderson married Miss America 1977 Dorothy Benham. The couple had four children together. Anderson and Benham were married for several years before divorcing. He now is remarried to Diane Anderson and they reside in Connecticut.

Career statistics

Regular season and playoffs

International

Transactions 
 On June 3, 1975 the Pittsburgh Penguins selected Russ Anderson in the second-round (No.31 overall) in the 1975 NHL draft.
 On December 29, 1981 the Pittsburgh Penguins traded Russ Anderson and a 1983 eighth-round pick (No.143-Chris Duperron) to the Hartford Whalers in exchange for Rick MacLeish.
 On June 1, 1983 the Hartford Whalers released Russ Anderson.
 On September 2, 1983 the Los Angeles Kings signed free agent Russ Anderson to a multi-year contract.

References

External links 
 

1955 births
Living people
American men's ice hockey defensemen
Hartford Whalers captains
Hartford Whalers players
Hershey Bears players
Ice hockey people from Minneapolis
Los Angeles Kings players
Minnesota Golden Gophers men's ice hockey players
New Haven Nighthawks players
Pittsburgh Penguins draft picks
Pittsburgh Penguins players
Winnipeg Jets (WHA) draft picks
NCAA men's ice hockey national champions